Face in the Crowd is an album by singer and songwriter Leon Russell.  The album was first released as a CD on  January 26, 1999. Album was by produced by Leon Russell and released by Sagestone Entertainment Records. Most of the songs were written by Russell, with two songs co-written by Jack Wessel. In Face in the Crowd, Russell returns to the style he is known for his unique Tulsa sound. Jack Wessel, a bass player, was a long time Leon Russell band member, starting in 1981.

On May 19, 1999 Leon promoted his album Face in the Crowd on The David Letterman Show live.

Track listing
All tracks composed by Leon Russell, except as noted.
 "Love Is a Battlefield" – 2:58 		
 "Dr. Love" (Leon Russell, Jack Wessel) – 4:25 		
 "Down in the Flood" – 4:07 		
 "So Hard to Say Goodbye" – 2:36 		
 "Betty Ann" – 4:19 		
 "This Heart of Mine" – 3:37 		
 "Message from My Baby" – 3:41 		
 "Blue Eyes and a Black Heart" – 4:06 		
 "What Will I Do Without You" – 4:41 		
 "Mean and Evil" – 2:52 		
 "The Devil Started Talking" – 4:17 		
 "Don't Bring the Blues to Bed" (Russell, Wessel) – 3:51

Personnel
Leon Russell
The Band: Jackie Wessel, Bass; Brandon Holder, Drums; and Beau Charron, Keyboards, Lap Steel Guitar, and Mandolin.

References

External links

Leon Russell discography
Leon Russell lyrics
Leon Russell Records
Leon Russell NAMM Oral History Program Interview (2012)

1999 albums
Leon Russell albums
Albums produced by Leon Russell